Since 2017, the Republic of Peru has experienced a period of political instability that initially took place between the government of Pedro Pablo Kuczynski (PPK) and allied parties against the majority-Fujimorist Congress.

The crisis emerged in late 2016 and early 2017 when polarization led to a schism between the Executive and Legislative branches. Kuczynski faced an impeachment attempt in December 2017, later resigning in March 2018 after a vote buying scandal emerged. His successor, Martín Vizcarra, initiated a series of anti-corruption reforms. After a series of disputes with the Fujimorist-led Congress, Vizcarra dissolved Congress and called for snap elections which took place in January 2020. After an unsuccessful impeachment attempt by Congress, Vizcarra was removed by Congress led by Manuel Merino. The removal was met with mass unrest, and Merino was ousted 5 days later following 2 deaths in the protests. The crackdown on the unrest was widely condemned by human rights organizations. Congress later chose Francisco Sagasti to lead a transitional government. In the aftermath of the 2021 Peruvian general election, a crisis emerged between supporters of Pedro Castillo and Fujimorists led by Keiko Fujimori. After multiple attempts to remove Castillo were unsuccessful, mass unrest broke out in April 2022. Castillo attempted a self-coup in December 2022 and was subsequently impeached and removed from office. Castillo was replaced with Dina Boluarte, which led to protests. The protests turned violent, which led to a violent crackdown and accusations of human rights abuses. During protests, the country began to turn towards authoritarianism following a ruling by the Constitutional Court of Peru in February 2023 that gave Congress de facto absolute control over the whole government.

Periods 
It can be divided so far into ten periods: the first period, or "first crisis", was due to a series of events that officially started on 15 September 2017, which led to a total fracture of the State in two. On one side is the executive power, referred to as "the officialism", led by the constitutionally elected president Pedro Pablo Kuczynski and on the other is the Congress of the Republic of Peru controlled mostly by the Fujimorist Popular Force party that calls itself "the opposition" led by its leader Keiko Fujimori. On 13 October, the Congress of the Republic dominated by the opposition resumed relations with the ruling party, albeit in a fragile manner.

The second period or "second crisis" is due to the prestige that the then President of the Republic, Pedro Pablo Kuczynski, lost after an alleged conflict of interest attributed to him was exposed; when he was the minister of state during the government of Alejandro Toledo (2001–2006), one of its one-person consulting firms had made professional services to the Odebrecht company and received substantial payments. Until then, Kuczynski had consistently denied having any employment relationship with that company. All this led to the first official request for a presidential vacancy due to "moral incapacity" for invariably lying about his association with the Odebrecht company, which was in accordance with the current constitution. This impeachment attempt failed, however. Soon after, Kuczynski pardoned the former president Alberto Fujimori, who was serving a 25-year sentence for crimes against human rights. The decision triggered massive protests in several cities, the resignation of three of its ministers and severe criticism from a broad spectrum of personalities. Then, on 28 February 2018, the Mulder Law was approved at the urging of APRA and Fujimorism. The law prohibited state advertisements in private media. Soon after came a second request for a presidential vacancy, promoted by the left and supported by the Fujimorists of Popular Force.

The third period or "third crisis" began a few days before the Congress debated the request for vacancy, when on 20 March 2018, the Fujimorists revealed videos and audio that showed that government operators, including a minister, negotiated with a Popular Force congressman to buy his vote against the vacancy, in exchange for works for his region. The next day, the president sent his letter of resignation to Congress, which was accepted on 23 March 2018. That same day the engineer Martín Vizcarra was sworn in as the new president, as he was in the line of succession as the first Vice President of the Republic.

The fourth period or "fourth crisis" began on 7 July 2018, when the IDL-Reporters portal unveiled the CNM Audios, recordings that would reveal alleged offers of penalties, orders and thanks for favors or negotiations for promotions. officials of the National Council of the Magistrature (body of the Public Ministry that would be related to diverse public figures like politicians, industrialists and sportsmen, headed by the lawyer César Hinostroza), this would cause the called marches against the corruption that demand "that go away all" referring to politicians in general and to the congress in particular. The ongoing president of the Republic Martin Vizcarra during his speech for national holidays said he will convene a referendum on the non-re-election of congressmen and members of the Magistracy. The referendum took place and caused relative calm with the victory of the Vizcarra official position.

The fifth period or "fifth crisis" began on 31 December 2018 when the prosecutor of the Nation Pedro Chávarry at hours of the new year of 2019 removed prosecutors José Domingo Pérez and Rafael Vela Barba, in charge of the Keiko Fujimori policy case and former President Alan García, that same day, a whole media burden was born by the Government led by President Vizcarra—including both sectors of the opposition and the political right and left–against that decision and against his own figure of the Prosecutor, demanding his resignation. The consequence, materialized on 2 January 2019, was the order of Chávarry to replace prosecutors Pérez and Vela.

The sixth period or "sixth crisis" began on 29 May 2019, when President Vizcarra accused Congress of delaying the approval of a package of political reforms (one of them, on parliamentary immunity, had been shelved by the Committee on Constitution without further debate), and raised a question of confidence for the approval of six of them within a specified period. Congress approved the trust issue on 5 June 2019 and expedited the approval of the opinions, making various modifications to the original projects of the Executive. On 25 July 2019 they were all approved, although two of them, being of a constitutional nature, were pending final approval for a second legislature.

The seventh period or "seventh crisis" began on 28 July 2019, when through a message to the Nation, Vizcarra pointed out that one of the core projects of political reform, that of parliamentary immunity (which sought to be the Judicial Power and not the Congress itself that lifted said immunity), had not been approved in its essence; he also reproached Congress for continuing to "shield" the prosecutor Chávarry and other figures related to the White Necks of the Port (CNM Audios case). Against this background, Vizcarra proposed the advancement of the general elections (for president and Congress), whose approval suggested that it could be done through a referendum. After more than a month of debates, the Constitution Commission of Congress shelved the project, considering it unconstitutional. Within a few days, Congress had scheduled the election of the new magistrates of the Constitutional Court; however, the Executive announced that it would present a new matter of confidence to modify the Organic Law of the Court, regarding the mechanism for the election of said magistrates, to guarantee its transparency, and be able to apply it for the current election. On the morning of 30 September 2019, Congress decided to continue with the election of the tribunes, electing the first magistrate Gonzalo Ortiz de Zevallos Olaechea and postponing until the afternoon of the same day the debate on the question of trust. As the debate ended and the question of trust was approved, President Vizcarra gave a message to the Nation, announcing that he was dissolving Congress considering that he had been denied confidence in fact because he had continued with the election of a magistrate. According to the Constitution, when Congress denies confidence for the second time to the Executive, the President is empowered to dissolve Congress (the first denial of confidence was to the Zavala cabinet, in the Kuczynski government, as it is considered the government of Vizcarra as an extension of that government). The Executive called elections for a new Congress, which was scheduled for January 2020.

Background 

The 2016 elections had faced the biggest blocks in their time, Popular Force led by Keiko Fujimori, Broad Front led by Verónika Mendoza and Peruvians for Change directed by Kuczynski.

At first it was believed that both the Congress and the Presidency would be occupied by the members of Popular Force due to their overwhelming majority; the other two parties already mentioned occupied the third and second place respectively. Mendoza (who was in third place) decided to ask his voters to support the election of the Peruvians for Change party so that he could achieve power.

The objective of the Broad Front was to counteract the large number of voters who had Popular Force. This objective was half-fulfilled, since Kuczynski came to the Presidency by a narrow margin, while Popular Force managed to maintain hegemony in Congress.

This resulted in Popular Force having decisive political power to handle some issues that competed with the new Kuczynski administration during the period 2016–2021.

Although they tried to bring a certain political harmony, both "sides" were confronted by a lack of understanding and by different interests. The main discrepancies they had were:

 The censorship of education minister Jaime Saavedra, who submitted his resignation on 17 December 2016 and the following day he was sworn in by the educator Marilú Martens.
 Resignation of the Minister of Economy and Finance Alfredo Thorne.
 Resignation of the transport and telecommunications minister Martín Vizcarra.
 Possible censorship of the education minister Marilú Martens.
 Acts of corruption and cronyism such as the Odebrecht case or the Negociazo scandal.
 Protests against the implementation of the education curriculum that, according to the organization Con mis hijos no te metas, contains the so-called "gender ideology".
 Little control over political façade movements such as Movadef, the political wing of the Shining Path.
 Consequences of El Niño.

First period (September–November 2017)

Denial of the request of confidence to the First Cabinet 

On 17 August 2017 the congresspeople of Popular Force filed a motion of interpellation against the Minister of Education Marilú Martens who was in negotiations with the representatives of the teachers, in search of the solution to a prolonged teacher strike.

On 25 August 2017, the plenary session of the Congress approved the motion of interpellation, with 79 votes in favor, 12 against and 6 abstentions. The votes in favor were from the bench of Popular Force, APRA, Broad Front and Popular Action. The date of the interpellation was set as 8 September.

The minister answered a list of 40 questions, mainly about the teachers' strike that still persisted. Martens acknowledged deficiencies in facing the teachers' strike, but assured that her management would not reverse the recognition of meritocracy within the teaching profession.

On 13 September, the Popular Force bench announced that it would submit a motion of censure against the minister, since it considered that it had not responded satisfactorily to the questions of the interpellation.

Faced with this threat of censorship (which would be the second against a head of Education in less than a year), Prime Minister Fernando Zavala asked Congress a question of confidence for the full ministerial cabinet; in other words, a renewal of the vote of confidence that had been given to him at the beginning of his administration.

From the Congress this request was criticized, stating that Zavala was in solidarity with a minister who was questioned, endangering her entire cabinet, and even more, when the motion of censure had not yet been made official. It was also said that the "renewal of trust" was something that the Constitution did not contemplate.

In any case, the Board of Spokespersons of the Congress summoned Zavala at four o'clock in the afternoon of 14 September to support her request for confidence. Zavala presented himself to the plenary session of the Congress with the ministers and presented his request in 12 minutes; his argument focused on the government's intention to defend the education policy that was intended, according to him, to undermine the education minister's censure. Then we proceeded to the parliamentary debate.

The question of trust was debated for 7 hours and voted in the early morning of 15. The cabinet failed to obtain the confidence of the Parliament, which voted against the confidence with 77, which produced the total crisis of the cabinet.

Kuczynski action 

On 17 September 2017, the second vice president and congresswoman Mercedes Aráoz Fernández was sworn in as president of the Council of Ministers of Peru and with this, five new ministers were announced: Claudia Cooper Fort (Economy), Idel Vexler (Education), Enrique Mendoza Ramírez (Justice and Human Rights), Fernando d'Alessio (Health) and Carlos Bruce (Housing).

The new head of the cabinet was sworn in with the 18 ministers in a ceremony held in the Court of Honor of the Government Palace. On 6 October, the vote of confidence will be given and if this is rejected for the second time, the president can dissolve the Congress and call new elections, as the Constitution of 1993 says.

The vote of confidence was delayed until 12 October, beginning with the exhibitions of the new cabinet led by Mercedes Aráoz Fernández and subsequent intervention of the different political caucuses of the Congress until 0:30 a.m. of the next day. It resulted in 83 votes in favor and 17 against.

Reactions 
Many political figureheads such as the media reported on the denial of confidence in the first cabinet; the journalist Rosa María Palacios sent a message to the president asking him to dissolve the Congress and warned that "Fujimorism has been trapped", the journalist César Hildebrandt also sent a message to the president saying that "the country requires him to confront Congress Fujimorist".

The former constitutional lawyer in an interview said that the now former president of the Council of Ministers Fernando Zavala "is sacrificing for state policies", the former president of the Council of Ministers Pedro Cateriano warned that "Keiko Fujimori, leader of the Popular Force party, wants to give a coup d'etat".

Second period (November 2017–March 2018)

Involvement of Kuczynski in the Odebrecht scandal

In November 2017, the Lava Jato Commission of the Congress, chaired by Rosa Bartra and that was dedicated to investigate the implications in Peru of the corruption network of the Odebrecht organization, received confidential information that President Kuczynski had had labor ties with this company, which went back to the time when he was Minister of State between 2004 and 2006, under the government of Alejandro Toledo Manrique, despite the fact that since the outbreak of the Odebrecht case, Kuczynski had denied him on several occasions.

The Commission then asked the Odebrecht company for details of its relationship with Kuczynski, which were publicly disclosed on 13 December 2017. It was revealed then that Westfield Capital, an investment banking advisory firm, founded and directed by Kuczynski had carried out seven consultancies for Odebrecht between November 2004 and December 2007 for 782,207 million dollars, that is, coinciding with the time when Kuczynski had been Minister of Economy (2004–2005) and President of the Council of Ministers (2005–2006). The information also revealed that another company closely related to Kuczynski, First Capital, formed by its Chilean partner Gerardo Sepúlveda, had also provided consulting services for Odebrecht between 2005 and 2013.

The information was seriously compromising for the president, because the payments to his personal consulting company had been made when he was Minister of State and in the case of consultancies referring to public works that the company carried out in Peru. This went against the constitutional rule that prevents state ministers from managing private businesses in the exercise of their public function (conflict of interest). Further perplexing the matter was the fact that these payments came from a company like Odebrecht, which is now known to have paid bribes to win the concession for works under the government of Toledo, when Kuczynski had been minister, one of which was the construction of the interoceanic route to Brazil.

Although Odebrecht's payments to the consulting firms related to PPK were legal, there were those who speculated that it could have been part of the company's remuneration for favoring it in the good of the works.

First request for a presidential vacancy by the Congress of the Republic 

The opposition to the government, led by Fuerza Popular, demanded the resignation of Kuczynski and threatened him with vacancy from the Presidency if he did not do so. Broad Front, for its part, stated that the vacancy should proceed directly.

At midnight on 14 December, Kuczynski, through a message to the nation, denied the accusations and said he would not resign his position. "I am here to tell you: I am not going to abdicate my honor or my values or my responsibilities as president of all Peruvians," he said at the outset.

In his defense, he claimed to have no relationship with the company First Capital, which was the sole property of Sepúlveda, and that only one of the payments mentioned had to do with him, the one dated in 2012, when he was no longer Minister of State. As for Westfield Capital, although he acknowledged that it was his sole proprietorship, he affirmed that he was never under his direction and administration while he was Minister of State, and that the contracts dated at that time had been signed by Sepúlveda, his partner. He also noted that all payments to his company were legal, and that they were duly registered, billed and banked.

PPK's explanations did not convince the opposition, and he was accused of continuing to lie, especially in relation to the fact that he had left Westfield Capital when he was minister, when, according to public records, he always figured as director of that company. Although PPK argued that there had been a "Chinese wall", an expression used in business to refer to when the partner or owner has no contact or receive information on the management of the company, while in public office (but in the case of Wesfield Capital, being a company where PPK was its sole agent, it is unclear how this "Chinese wall" could be made). Faced with the refusal of the president to resign, several of the opposition caucuses of Congress then proposed to submit their position to the vacancy.

The leftist Broad Front bench submitted a motion for the vacancy request to be debated in the plenary session of the Congress. The congresspersons of Fuerza Popular, APRA and Alianza para el Progreso joined the request and that is how they surpassed more than the 26 signatures needed to proceed with the process. Once the motion was approved, the debate began at 4 and 38 in the afternoon of 15 December and lasted until 10 at night.

The opposition legislators who introduced the motion cited a moral incapacity when they denounced that the president lied in the statements he gave about his ties with the Brazilian company.

The congressmen demanded that the due process be followed, reproaching the fact that the opposition proceeded with unusual speed and that several of its members had already decided to empty the president without having heard his defense. They also questioned the fact that a single report from Odebrecht was considered sufficient evidence, thereby overtly dispensing with the investigation that demanded such a delicate and far-reaching case.

According to the regulations, the vote of 40% of competent congressmen was needed for the admission of the vacancy request. As 118 congressmen were present, only 48 votes were needed, which was widely exceeded, as they voted 93 in favor and 17 against; these last ones were, in their great majority, those of the pro-government caucus.

Once the vacancy request was approved, the Congress agreed that on Thursday, 21 December, at 9 o'clock in the morning, Kuczynski should appear before the plenary session of the Congress to make his disclaimers; then it would proceed to debate and finally vote to decide the presidential vacancy, needed for this 87 votes of the total of 130 congressmen.

On the appointed day, PPK went to Congress to exercise his defense, accompanied by his lawyer Alberto Borea Odría. The defense began with the speech of the president himself, in which he denied having committed any act of corruption. Then came Borea's defense, which had as its axis the consideration that the vacancy request was an exaggeration because you could not accuse a president of the Republic without demonstrating with irrefutable evidence his "permanent moral incapacity", a concept that the congressmen did not they had apparently very clear, because strictly the constitutional precept would be referring to a mental incapacity. He considered that the offenses or imputed crimes had to be ventilated first in the investigating commission, before drawing hasty conclusions. He also rejected that PPK has repeatedly lied about his relationship with Odebrecht (argument that the Fujimoristas used to justify their permanent moral incapacity), because the facts in question had happened twelve years ago and he did not have to have them present in detail.

After the speech of Borea, the congressional debate that lasted fourteen hours began. Voting for the vacancy took place after eleven o'clock at night, with the following result: 78 votes in favor, 19 against and 21 abstentions. One of the benches, the one of New Peru (left), retired before the voting, because to say of its members they did not want to follow the game to Fujimorism. Since 87 votes were needed to proceed with the vacancy, this was dismissed. The whole Popular Force bench voted in favor of the vacancy, with the exception of 10 of its members, led by Kenji Fujimori, who abstained, and who thus decided the result. The rumor spread that this dissident group, which would later be called the "Avengers", had negotiated its votes with the government in exchange for the presidential pardon in favor of Alberto Fujimori, its historical leader who was then imprisoned. After the Popular Force bench and led by Kenji announced the formation of a new political group, which would support the government.

Pardon to Alberto Fujimori 

On 24 December 2017, President PPK granted a humanitarian pardon to Alberto Fujimori, who had been imprisoned for 12 years, with a sentence of 25 years for crimes of human rights violations (La Cantuta and Barrios Altos cases). The government assured that the pardon had been decided for purely humanitarian reasons, in view of the various physical ills afflicting the former president of the Republic, confirmed by reports of a medical board.

However, a strong suspicion arose that the pardon would have been the result of a furtive pact of the PPK government with the sector of the Fujimorist bloc that had abstained during the vote for the presidential vacancy and that had thus prevented it from concrete this. The pardon also motivated the resignation of the official congressmen Alberto de Belaunde, Vicente Zeballos and Gino Costa; of the Minister of Culture Salvador del Solar and Minister of Defense Jorge Nieto Montesinos. The Minister of the Interior, Carlos Basombrío Iglesias, had already resigned. There were also several marches in Lima and the interior of the country in protest against the pardon.

Alberto Fujimori, who days before the pardon had been admitted to a clinic for complications in his health, was discharged on 4 January 2018 and so could, for the first time, move freely.

PPK formed a new ministerial cabinet, which he called "the Cabinet of Reconciliation," which according to him, should mark a new stage in the relationship between the Executive and the Legislative. Mercedes Aráoz held the presidency of the Council of Ministers and eight ministerial changes were made, the most important renewal in what was going on in the government.

Approval of the Mulder Law 
On 15 November 2017, through Bill No. 2133, Congressman Mauricio Mulder presented the Mulder Law, which prohibited state advertising in private media and on 28 February 2018 approved the bill by the Permanent Commission of the Congress with 20 in favor, 3 against and 14 abstentions. The ruling was approved at the urging of APRA and Fujimorism on 15 June 2018 with 70 votes in favor, 30 against and 7 abstentions. and it was published on 18 June 2018 in the Legal Rules of the Official Gazette El Peruano.

Second request for a presidential vacancy by the Congress of the Republic 

Only days after the first attempt at a presidential vacancy, in January 2018, the Broad Front caucus filed a new vacancy request, alleging Alberto Fujimori's pardon, which allegedly had been negotiated and granted illegally. This did not prosper, given the lack of support from Fuerza Popular, whose votes were necessary to carry out such an initiative. Under that experience, the leftist groups of Broad Front and Nuevo Peru promoted another vacancy motion, concentrating exclusively on the Odebrecht case, arguing that new indications of corruption and conflict of interest had been discovered by PPK when he was Minister of State in the government of Alejandro Toledo. This time they won the support of Fuerza Popular, as well as other groups like Alianza para el Progreso (whose spokesperson, César Villanueva, was the main promoter of the initiative), thus gathering the 27 minimum votes necessary to present a multiparty motion before the Congress of the Republic, what was done on 8 March 2018.

On 15 March, the admission of this motion was debated in the plenary session of the Congress, the result being 87 votes in favor, 15 votes against and 15 abstentions. The motion received the backing of all the benches, except for Peruvians for Change and non-grouped congressmen, among them, the three former pro-government officials and the Kenji Fujimori bloc. The Board of Spokespersons scheduled the debate on the presidential vacancy request for Thursday, 22 March.

A confidential report from the Financial Intelligence Unit (FIU) on the money movements of PPK's bank accounts was forwarded to the Public Ministry and the Lava Jato Commission of Congress, but inexplicably leaked to public knowledge. This 33-page document revealed that from the companies and consortiums linked to the Odebrecht Group transfers had been made to Westfield Capital, the one-person PPK company, for $1,893,841, that is, one million more than what was known the moment. Transfers made to the account of the driver of PPK and that of Gilbert Violeta were also revealed, although it was shown that these were only payments of a labor nature and of basic services. The leak of this report, which is presumed to have been made by the Lava Jato Commission chaired by Rosa Bartra, would have been with the intention of further identifying the credibility of the President of the Republic. But the death blow for PPK came a few days later.

Third period (March–July 2018)

Scandal for the collection of the kenjivideos 

On 20 March 2018, the Popular Force bench showed evidence that the government was buying the support of congressmen to vote against the second presidential vacancy request, a rumor that had already circulated during the first process. It was a set of videos where the conversations made by the legislators Bienvenido Ramírez and Guillermo Bocángel (from the bench of Kenji Fujimori) to try to convince Congressman Moisés Mamani (from Puno) not to join to support the presidential vacancy, in exchange for works for your region. In one of the videos, Kenji Fujimori is seen in a meeting with Mamani, which also includes Bienvenido Ramírez. The latter makes a series of offers to the parliamentarian from Puno to enable him to streamline projects and projects for his region, in exchange for joining his group and supporting PPK. In another video we see Bocángel talking about the administrative control of the Congress, once they access the Board. And in a third video, we see Alberto Borea Odría, PPK's lawyer on the subject of vacancy, explaining to Mamani about aspects of that process and giving him the telephone number of a minister of state. Those involved in the scandal, came out to defend themselves, saying that it was normal practice for congressmen to turn to ministers to ask for works in favor of their regions. Congressman Bienvenido even said that he had only "bragged". But what was questioned was the fact that the government negotiated these works to reorient the vote of a group of congressmen on the issue of the presidential vacancy, which would constitute the criminal figure of influence peddling.

A few hours later, the Fujimoristas gave the final thrust, by broadcasting a set of audios, in which the Minister of Transport and Communications, Bruno Giuffra is heard offering works to Mamani in exchange for his vote to avoid the vacancy. The press highlighted a phrase by Giuffra in which he says: "Compadre, you know what the nut is and what you are going to get out", presumably referring to the benefits Mamani would gain if he voted against the vacancy.

Until then, it was expected that the vote to achieve the vacancy would be very tight and that even PPK could again succeed as had happened in the first process. But the Kenjivideos determined that several congressmen who until then had manifested their abstention (among them the three ex- oficialistas) folded in favor of the vacancy, and thus they made it known openly.

Resignation of Pedro Pablo Kuczynski 

Faced with the foreseeable scenario that awaited him in the debate scheduled for the Congress on the 22nd, PPK opted to renounce the Presidency of the Republic, sending the respective letter to Congress, and giving a televised message to the Nation, which was transmitted to the two and forty in the afternoon of 21 March 2018.

The Board of Spokespersons of the Congress, although rejected the terms of the letter of resignation of PPK, arguing that this did not make any self-criticism and victimized, accepted the same and scheduled for 22 March, from four in the afternoon, a debate in Congress to evaluate the resignation. That debate lasted until the next day. Although a section of congressmen on the left argued that the resignation of PPK should not be accepted and that Congress should proceed to vacancy due to moral incapacity, the majority of congressmen considered that it should be accepted, to put an end to the crisis. When the preliminary text of the resolution of the Congress was published, in which it was indicated that the president had "betrayed the fatherland", PPK announced that it would withdraw its letter of resignation if that qualification was maintained. The Board of Spokesmen decided then to omit that expression. The resignation was accepted with 105 votes in favor, 12 against and 3 abstentions. Moments later, the first vice-president Martín Vizcarra was sworn in as the new constitutional president of the Republic. Soon after, the new government announced that its prime minister would be César Villanueva, the same who had been the main promoter of the second Presidential vacancy against PPK.

Fourth period (July–December 2018)

Crisis in the judicial system 

On 7 July 2018 the portal IDL-Reporters led by journalist Gustavo Gorriti broadcast a series of audios through the journalistic program Panorama. Therefore, an intricate corruption scandal called CNM Audios or Court and Corruption case was uncovered. These are telephone tapping that reveal alleged acts of corruption and influence peddling that directly involved judges and members of the Council of the Magistracy (CNM). In the audios we listen to César José Hinostroza Pariachi (supreme judge), Iván Noguera Ramos (counselor), Julio Gutiérrez (counselor) and Walter Ríos (president of the Superior Court of Callao), negotiating and using his personal influence in areas of government, through connections with people, and to obtain favors and preferential treatment. These controversial audios had been leaked by the journalists of an investigation approved by prosecutor Rocío Sánchez Saavedra to intercept the telephone calls of numbers seized by the police to a criminal organization dedicated to drug trafficking (the castanets of Richport), which operated in the port of Callao. These telephone numbers belonged to the lawyers of that organization who contacted the judicial authorities, and it was thus, in that accidental manner, that the scandal that has led the crisis to the entire judicial system of Peru was uncovered.

On 11 July 2018, President Vizcarra announced the creation of a commission to reform the Judiciary (chaired by Allan Wagner Tizón) and that same day the President of the Supreme Court of Justice Duberlí Rodríguez announced a crisis in the judicial system. On the other hand, the supreme Internal Control Prosecutor, Víctor Raúl Rodríguez Monteza, gave IDL-Reporters and the Panorama program three days to deliver the audios and their sources. However, this did not materialize because the wiretaps contained in those audios had been given legally, and because journalists are not obliged to reveal their sources because of their right to confidentiality. In the following days more audios were made known that involved characters from all areas, not just politics.

On 13 July 2018, the Minister of Justice and Human Rights of Peru Salvador Heresi presented his resignation letter because in one of those audios he is heard talking to the controversial judge César Hinostroza. In his replacement, lawyer and congressman Vicente Zeballos Salinas, who had been a member of the PPK parliamentary caucus, was appointed.

Before the institutional crisis in the Judicial Power, Duberlí Rodríguez resigned to the presidency of the Supreme Court of Justice on 19 July 2018. The next day he was appointed to preside over the First Chamber of Constitutional and Social Transitional Law of the Supreme Court of Justice of the Republic.

On 20 July 2018, following the resignation of Supreme Court President Duberlí Rodríguez as a consequence of the CNM Audios scandal, Francisco Távara Córdova, in his capacity as supreme dean, assumed the presidency of said institution on an interim basis.

Swearing in of Pedro Chávarry as the new prosecutor of the Nation 

On 7 June 2018 attorney Pedro Chávarry was elected by the Board of Supreme Prosecutors of the Public Ministry as Prosecutor of the Nation for the period 2018–2021. On 3 July, the National Board of Justice ratified it unanimously as supreme prosecutor. Twelve days later (On 19 July 2018) an audio was broadcast between Judge César Hinostroza and the elected fiscal of the Nation, Pedro Chávarry, which caused massive protests at the national level to request his resignation, however on 20 July 2018 he was sworn in as Prosecutor of the Nation. Despite being involved in the corruption scandal, prosecutor Chávarry refused to resign his position.

Annulment of the pardon of Alberto Fujimori 
On 3 October, the Judicial Branch issued placement and arrest warrants against former President Alberto Fujimori. His lawyers had 5 days (from 4 October) to support an appeal. On 9 October, the appeal filed by his lawyers was rejected. Next, the judge ordered to locate him and capture him, an end of the sea re-entered in a prison.

As a result of the annulment of the pardon, the legislators at the end of Fujimorism, would approve a series of reforms among them are:

 One that validates the immediate reelection of the deputies.
 Reinstalls two cameras in Congress and indicates that its members will be called parliamentarians.
 It eliminates the mechanism of trust that allows the president to close the Congress.
 It removes the obligation of the legislators to present a declaration of their patrimonial assets.
 Excludes the principles of irreproachable conduct and parity.
 Rejects the criterion of representation of the indigenous population.

Arrest of Keiko Fujimori 
On 10 October, in the Office of the Prosecutor of Peru, Judge Richard Concepción Carhuancho ordered a preliminary detention of Keiko Fujimori for 10 days, for the alleged illicit contributions to the 2011 campaign from the Odebrecht company.

On 17 October, after an appeal, Fujimori was released, along with five other detainees, because no feasible evidences of her responsibility were found.

Escape of César Hinostroza 

The dismissed Judge Hinostroza, who was weighed by an order preventing him from leaving the country since 13 July for the alleged crimes of passive bribery and active bribery, for a period of four months. He would leave the country illegally, violating the law and leaving clandestinely in the north of the country, on 7 October at dawn hours. Ten days later (17 October), the information would be publicly known, after which Interior Minister Mauro Medina, would present his resignation, after being identified by the political class as one of the responsible for the escape of the syndicate leader of the organization "The White Collars of the Port". The next day the removal of José Abanto from the Oficialía Mayor occurred, due to the delay in sending the prosecutorial file against Judge César Hinostroza to the Prosecutor's Office, appointing Gianmarco Paz Mendoza as his replacement.

Preventive detention of Keiko Fujimori 
On 19 October 2018, prosecutor José Domingo Pérez systemized the preparatory investigation and requested 36 months of preventive detention for Keiko Fujimori and eleven other persons involved for alleged money laundering (among them: Jaime Yoshiyama, his nephew Jorge Yoshiyama, Vicente Silva Checa, Augusto Bedoya, Ana Herz and Pier Figari). After reviewing the request for pretrial detention, Judge Richard Concepción Carhuancho began to review the one of the other ten people around Keiko, but on 31 October 2018, when he had only assessed the legal status of five of them, he decided surprisingly give your verdict regarding Keiko Fujimori. After accepting the tax thesis that accused him of being the head of a presumed criminal organization within his party that lavished a million dollars given by Odebrecht in 2011, and considering that there was a risk that it would hinder the process, the judge dictated 36 months of preventive detention for Keiko Fujimori.

Political asylum of Alan García 
On 15 November 2018, Alan García went to a meeting with the prosecution of money laundering, as part of an interrogation, carried out by, part of the prosecutor José Domingo Pérez due to irregularities in the conference payments of the former president, financed with money from Caja 2 of the structured operations division of the Odebrecht company, before this the prosecutor issued an order to prevent him from leaving the country for 18 months for García, even though at first he said he was at the disposition of the justice, that same night he went to the home of Carlos Alejandro Barros, ambassador of Uruguay, where he remained until 3 December 2018, when Tabaré Vázquez, president of that country, announced the rejection of Alan García's asylum request, consider that in Peru the three branches of the State functioned freely and without political persecution.

Fifth period (December 2018–May 2019)

Dismissal of Rafael Vela Barba and José Domingo Pérez and his subsequent reincorporation 

On 31 December 2018, when the prosecutor of the Nation Pedro Chávarry removed prosecutors Rafael Vela Barba and José Domingo Pérez from the Odebrecht case in Peru, he replaced prosecutors Frank Almanza Altamirano and Marcial Eloy Paucar, respectively. This fact provoked multiple protests at the national level led by the antifujimorism. In a press conference called for the closing of 2018, Pedro Chávarry said he made that decision, since the prosecutors in question, who had important investigations, had "affected the Public Prosecutor's Office" with their comments through different means of communication.

For his part, President Martin Vizcarra, who was in Brazil for the inauguration of Jair Bolsonaro, questioned Chávarry's decision and immediately returned to Peru. On 2 January 2019, Vizcarra presented before the Congress a bill that declared emergency in the Public Ministry, that same day Pedro Chávarry before the massive protests against him decided to reinstate Rafael Vela Barba and José Domingo Pérez in the lava case jato However, he refrained from resigning.

Resignation of Pedro Chávarry 

On 7 January 2019, Chávarry indicated that he was going to present his resignation letter. On 8 January, before the Board of Supreme Prosecutors, Chávarry resigned as president of the Public Prosecutor's Office. On 8 January, the Board accepted the resignation of Chávarry and appointed Supreme Public Prosecutor Zoraida Ávalos as the new interim Nation Prosecutor. Who in his first message as president of the Office of the Prosecutor declared the Public Prosecutor's Office in emergency.

Removal of Judge Richard Concepción Carhuancho from the Cocktails Case 
On 16 January 2019, the Second National Criminal Appeals Chamber decided to remove Judge Richard Concepción Carhuancho from the case of cocktails for which Keiko Fujimori and other members of Fuerza Popular have been investigated. This measure was presented by the defense of Jaime Yoshiyama. The challenge against Judge Richard Concepción was evaluated by the Second National Criminal Court of Appeals, composed of judges César Salhuanay Calsin, Jessica León Yarango and Iván Quispe Auca. Who made that decision unanimously.

According to the resolution of the Second Chamber, the judges considered that public statements by Richard Concepción Carhuancho questioned his impartiality, so that the case passed into the hands of another judge of the National Criminal Chamber. This event unleashed new social protests led by antifujimorism in different cities of the country.

Return of Alberto Fujimori to prison 
On 23 January 2019 Alberto Fujimori was transferred again to the Barbadillo prison in the Ate District, where he was interned from 2007 to 2017, serving his sentence before being pardoned. The former president was discharged from the Centennial Clinic after a medical board of the Institute of Legal Medicine evaluated him and determined that he is stable and that he can receive treatment for his ailments.

Signing of the collaboration agreement with Odebrecht 
On 15 February 2019, the collaboration agreement with Odebrecht was signed in São Paulo between the Lava Jato special team and senior officials of the Odebrecht company. Among the information that the company will provide is the My Web Day and Drousys systems, corporate software in which requested, processed and controlled the operations of the payment of bribes, names, data, dates, reports and evidence that can be used in a trial the politicians involved.

The agreement was criticized by numerous congressmen, this because the total amount of civil compensation was not taken into account and the company obtained benefits on the management of its profits, with the possibility of re-contracting with the State of Peru.

Suicide of Alan García 
On 17 April 2019, former Peruvian President Alan García committed suicide in the bedroom of his personal home when the officers of the national police had gone to arrest him preliminarily on matters related to the Odebrecht case. His funeral took place at the Casa del Pueblo and was cremated on 19 April at the Catholic cemetery in Huachipa.

García did not receive posthumous government honors such as the state funeral to former leaders, at the request of relatives and supporters of APRA, according to some national and international analysts this gesture represents a new nuance of the political crisis in the country that has been developing since 2017.

The Peruvian government, through the national daily El Peruano, declared three days of national mourning: 17, 18 and 19 April. According to the Public Prosecutor's Office, the search of García's home that was included in the investigations of the Odebrecht case would continue its normal course, with the exception of the bedroom that remains sealed.

Preventive prison for Pedro Pablo Kuczynski 
After a 3-day hearing, on 19 April 2019, the Judiciary issued 36 months of pre-trial detention for former President Pedro Pablo Kuczynski. However, due to the heart condition he suffers, and that led him to be operated on emergency at the Anglo-American clinic, on 27 April he was exchanged for home detention.

The "Fujimorista-Aprista strategic alliance" and crisis in Peruvians for Change 
The APRA Congressman Javier Velásquez Quesquén admitted that, although there was never a political alliance between APRA and Popular Force, there was a "strategic alliance" within Congress, which explained that the board of directors had shared in two consecutive legislatures, and that coincide in the votes of the plenary and of the commissions. However, other members of the Aprismo and Popular Force rejected the existence of such an alliance, although the facts say otherwise. A study shows that, during the plenary sessions, the majority positions of Popular Force and the APRA caucus coincided 90.2% of the time so far in the current congressional period; that is, in 782 of the 867 votes, Fuerza Popular and APRA went hand in hand.

Peruvians for Change, the party that had brought Pedro Pablo Kuczynski to the presidency in 2016, and which, in theory, was the official party of the Vizcarra government, declared a reorganization. Kuczynski himself presented his irrevocable resignation to the party presidency on 4 February 2019. The Peruvians for Change bench in Congress, which was initially 17 members, was reduced to 11. Two of them, Gilbert Violeta (at the same time leader of Peruvians for Change) and Juan Sheput (until then only invited to the party) had friction with Martín Vizcarra, hinting that there was a gap between the party and the government. It was seen that two factions had formed on the Peruvians for Change caucus: a majority faction, led by Mercedes Aráoz and Carlos Bruce, who wanted to continue supporting the government with conditions; and another, commanded by Gilbert Violeta and Juan Sheput, supported by what remained of the game, which aimed to break with Vizcarra. Vizcarra's estrangement from the Peruvians for Change party was further exacerbated by the revelation that the Construction Club had contributed $100,000 for the 2016 Kuczynki campaign. The party leaders (Violeta, Heresi and the Peruvians for Change general secretary Jorge Villacorta), agreed to hold Vizcarra responsible for controlling the financing of the campaign, as revealed in conversations on WhatsApp leaked to the press. Not agreeing with this position, three Peruvians for Change congressmen announced their resignation from the party: Jorge Meléndez Celis (bench spokesman), Alberto Oliva and Janet Sánchez, although without affecting their permanence on the Peruvians for Change bench.

On 2 March 2019, the Peruvians for Change party assembly agreed to change its name to Contigo. It also made official the admission to the party of Juan Sheput, who until then had only been invited. Contigo's leadership said the party supported Vizcarra "100%" and said that the Peruvians for Change caucus in Congress should also change its name. But the Peruvians for Change congressmen, for the most part, agreed to keep the original name. Violeta and Sheput then requested a temporary license from the bench, but the bench did not accept and even opened disciplinary proceedings against them. Given this, both congressmen decided to resign from the bench, which was thus reduced to nine members (6 March 2019). None of those nine members of the Peruvians for Change caucus, including Mercedes Aráoz and Carlos Bruce, was a member of the party.

Sixth period (May–September 2019)

Vizcarra intends to carry out political reform 
On 21 December 2018, the government formalized the formation of the High Level Commission for Political Reform. It was made up of political scientist Fernando Tuesta Soldevilla, as coordinator, and academics Paula Valeria Muñoz Chirinos, Milagros Campos Ramos, Jessica Violeta Bensa Morales and Ricardo Martin Tanaka Dongo. It was installed on 5 January 2019. Based on the report that said Commission gave, the government presented twelve proposals for political reform to Congress (11 April 2019). However, it excluded the issue of bicamerality, as it was recently rejected in the referendum.

Among the three projects of constitutional reform was the one that sought the balance between the Executive and Legislative powers with the objective of establishing counterweights between both; the reform that modifies the impediments to be a candidate for any position of popular election, to improve the suitability of the applicants; and the reform that seeks to extend the regional and municipal mandate to five years, to coincide with the general elections. For the Legislative Branch, it was proposed that the election of the congressmen be carried out in the second presidential round; the elimination of the preferential vote and the establishment of parity and alternation in the list of candidates were proposed. On the other hand, for political parties, the aim was to promote internal democracy and citizen participation in the selection of candidates, establishing internal, open, simultaneous and compulsory elections organized by the ONPE. Other reforms related to the registration and cancellation in the registry of political organizations, and the requirements to keep the registration in force, as well as the regulation of the financing of political organizations, to avoid corruption. Another proposal was that the lifting of parliamentary immunity should not be the responsibility of Congress, but of the Supreme Court of Justice.

Vizcarra raises trust issue for political reform 
On 29 May 2019, from the Great Hall of the Government Palace, President Vizcarra gave a message to the Nation, in which he announced his decision to raise the issue of trust before Congress in support of political reform. This, after the Constitution Commission, with a Fujimori majority, sent the bill on parliamentary immunity to the archive, and the Permanent Commission, also with a Fujimori majority, filed practically all the complaints weighing on the controversial prosecutor Chávarry. The president, accompanied by members of his ministerial cabinet and regional governors, stated that the issue of trust would be based on the approval, without violating its essence, of six of the bills for political reform, considered the most central:

If Congress denied the issue of confidence, it would be the second time that it did (the previous one went to the Zavala cabinet of the government of Pedro Pablo Kuczynski), for which, according to the Constitution, faced with two refusals, the President would be empowered to dissolve Congress and call new parliamentary elections within four months.

The following day, Prime Minister Salvador del Solar appeared before Congress to deliver the official letter requesting that the time and date of the plenary session be established, in which he will support the issue of trust. In this document, Del Solar indicated that he would propose that the maximum term for the approval of the six political reforms be at the end of the current legislature (15 June); otherwise, it would consider that Congress denied confidence to the ministerial cabinet. In response to the request, Congress President Daniel Salaverry called the plenary session for 4 June to meet the Executive's request for confidence.

The six political reform projects were defined as follows:

The Constitution Commission invited jurists Raúl Ferrero Costa, Natale Amprimo, Ernesto Álvarez, Aníbal Quiroga and Óscar Urviola to collect their opinions on the Executive's approach and the constitutionality of the approach.

Congress approves the question of confidence 
On 4 June 2019, Salvador del Solar appeared in the plenary session of Congress to expose and request the question of trust before the national representation. Previously, a previous question was rejected to evaluate the constitutionality of the trust request. Several voices in Congress considered that imposing a deadline for the approval of constitutional reforms and forcing their essence to be respected was unconstitutional, since reforms of this type were the exclusive responsibility of Congress and the Executive lacked the power to observe them. Due to these criticisms, Del Solar, in his presentation, lightened that part of his demand. He said that Congress was empowered to extend the legislature if necessary, and that it was not obliged to approve the bills to the letter, but could enrich them, although insisting that they should not alter their essence. "This question of trust is not a threat," he concluded.

After the presentation of the Prime Minister, the parliamentary debate began, which had to be extended until the following day. Finally, at noon on 5 June 2019, the vote was held. The question was approved with 77 votes in favor, 44 against and 3 abstentions. The members of the left-wing benches (Frente Amplio and Nuevo Perú) and Apra voted against, while those of Fuerza Popular did so in a divided manner (33 in favor, 16 against and 2 abstentions).

Debate and approval of opinions on political reform 
The Constitution commission debated the opinions between 7 June and 20 July. A series of changes were made in the projects, but the most striking was what was committed with the latest opinion, on the lifting of immunity of parliamentarians. The Constitution Commission rejected the Executive's proposal that the Supreme Court be in charge of raising immunity for congressmen, providing that Congress continue to retain that prerogative. The only variant was that it proposed definite terms for Congress to lift immunity once the Judicial Power made the respective request. In addition, it was proposed that the request be given only when there is a final judgment.

When the Prime Minister Salvador del Solar was consulted on the opinions approved by the Constitution Commission, he considered that only five respected the spirit of the reforms proposed by the Executive, and that the last one, on parliamentary immunity, meant a setback, since it did not respect the a matter of trust, which had arisen precisely when the Constitution Commission sent the same project to the archive.

The six projects were submitted to the plenary session of Congress, were approved between 22 and 25 July, including modifications that further accentuated the distortion of the original projects of the Executive, especially regarding internal democracy and parliamentary immunity.

Complaint against Congress President Daniel Salaverry 
Daniel Salaverry, elected president of Congress for the 2018–2019 legislature with the support of his then Popular Force bench, starred in a series of confrontations with his co-religionists, marked by a series of epithets, attempts at censorship and accusations, which led him to distance himself of Fuerza Popular and approach President Vizcarra, who saw him as an ally to curb the dominance of Fujimori in Congress. This earned him retaliation from his former bench partners. An investigation of the television program Panorama denounced that Salaverry had repeatedly presented false data in his representation week reports (an obligation that congressmen have to visit the provinces they represent, to listen to the demands of their constituents), which included photos from other events.

Alejandro Toledo's arrest in the United States 

Former President Alejandro Toledo, has been a fugitive since 2017, after the Peruvian justice issued two orders of preventive detention against him: the first in the case of the Interoceánica Sur, for having allegedly received a bribe of US$20 million from the company Odebrecht (later it was said that it was US$35 million); and the second by the Ecoteva case, under the accusation of money laundering when properties whose value did not correspond to his income were discovered (one of them in the name of his mother-in-law). Both cases are presumed to be connected. To the reiterated testimony of the effective collaborator in the Odebrecht case, Jorge Barata, has been added that of Josef Maiman, an Israeli businessman who had served as figurehead for Toledo. This is one of the most solid cases that the prosecution has.

After Toledo was found in the United States, an extradition process was initiated in the Odebrecht case. On 16 July 2019, the American judge ordered his preliminary arrest. On 19 July 2019, the hearing chaired by Judge Thomas Hixson, of the Northern District Court of California, was held to determine his legal situation. He was expected to be released after paying bail, to continue the extradition process in freedom, but the judge determined that he remained in prison as there was danger of escape. One of the arguments in favor of this decision was the fact that a briefcase with US$40,000 was found with Toledo, which made the judge suspect that Toledo was preparing to leave the country.

Election of the board of directors of the Congress for the period 2019–2020 
On 27 July 2019, Congress elected its new board of directors for the 2019–2020 term. He won the list headed by Pedro Olaechea, supported by Popular Force, APRA, Contigo and Change 21, who beat the list headed by Daniel Salaverry, who was seeking his reelection with the support of the other political groups. The result was 76 votes in favor of Olaechea, 47 in favor of Salaverry and 2 blank votes. Pedro Olaechea, an economist and businessman by profession, had been elected to Congress by PPK, and was also a minister in the Kuczynski government. But then it separated from its bench and promoted the creation of another, called the Parliamentary Agreement, and then started another with the name of Republican Action. Although he called himself independent, Olaechea, throughout his parliamentary career was characterized by always voting in the line of Fujimori.Accompanying him on the board of directors were: Karina Beteta (Popular Force) in the first vice-presidency; Salvador Heresi (Contigo) in the second vice presidency; and Marvin Palma (Change 21) in the third vice-presidency.

Seventh period (September 2019–January 2020)

Constitutional crisis

Constitutional Court nominations 
The Congress scheduled the election of the new members to the Constitutional Court of Peru for 30 September.

On 30 September, the prime minister Salvador del Solar went to the Legislative Palace to request the approval of an amendment to the Organic Law of the Constitutional Court as a matter of confidence. However, the Congress scheduled the minister to the afternoon. While the congress started the debate for the election of the new judges, the prime minister entered the Congress hemicycle room. Del Solar addressed the lawmakers to vote to reform the Constitutional Court nomination process. However, the Congress decided to postpone the vote of the amendment to the afternoon.

The Congress named a new member to the Constitutional Court of Peru. Many of the Constitutional Court nominees selected by Congress were alleged to be involved in corruption. Hours later, the Congress approved the confidence motion.

Dissolution of Congress 
Notwithstanding the affirmative vote, Vizcarra stated that the appointment of a new member of the Constitutional Court constituted a de facto vote of no confidence He said that it was the second act of no-confidence in his government, granting him the authority to dissolve Congress. These actions by Congress, as well as the months of slow progress towards anti-corruption reforms, pushed Vizcarra to dissolve the legislative body on 30 September, with Vizcarra stating "Peruvian people, we have done all we could."

Congress declares interim president 
Shortly after Vizcarra announced the dissolution of Congress, the legislative body refused to recognize the president's actions, declared Vizcarra as suspended from the presidency, and named Vice President Mercedes Aráoz as the interim president of Peru. Despite this, Peruvian government officials stated that the actions by Congress were void as the body was officially closed at the time of their declarations. By the night of 30 September, Peruvians gathered outside of the Legislative Palace of Peru to protest against Congress and demand the removal of legislators while the heads of the Peruvian Armed Forces met with Vizcarra, announcing that they still recognized him as president of Peru and head of the armed forces.

Resignation of Aráoz 
During the evening of 1 October 2019, Mercedes Aráoz, whom Congress had declared interim president, resigned from office. Aráoz resigned, hoping that the move would promote the new general elections proposed by Vizcarra and postponed by Congress. President of Congress Pedro Olaechea was left momentarily speechless when informed of Aráoz's resignation during an interview. At the time, no governmental institution or foreign government recognized Aráoz as president.

Legislative elections decreed 
Vizcarra issued a decree calling for legislative elections on 26 January 2020. The Organization of American States released a statement saying that the Constitutional Court could determine the legality of President Vizcarra's actions and supported his call for legislative elections, saying "It’s a constructive step that elections have been called in accordance with constitutional timeframes and that the definitive decision falls to the Peruvian people".

Snap election
The snap elections occurred on 26 January 2020. The APRA and Popular Force lost a majority in congress, put Popular Action, a party that was part of the opposition, won more seats, but not the majority.

Eighth period (March–November 2020)

COVID-19 reaches Peru

On 6 March, the first Peruvian case of COVID-19 was reported, from a man who came from the Czech Republic. The economy declined, as Peru eventually got hit by the worst declining economy in Latin America, support for Vizcarra deteriorated, and was eventually described as the worst hit country in South America by COVID-19.

Cisneros tapes
Since early 2020, investigations began surrounding a contract for a little-known singer by the name of Richard Cisneros to perform speeches for the Ministry of Culture. It was alleged that an inexperienced Cisneros was able to receive payments totaling US$50,000 due to contacts in the Government Palace. Investigators searched offices in the Government Palace on 1 June 2020 regarding the alleged irregularities.

On 10 September 2020, opposition lawmaker Edgar Alarcon, who faced possible parliamentary immunity revocation related to alleged acts of corruption, released audio recordings purporting that Vizcarra acted with "moral incapacity". The recordings allegedly contain audio of Vizcarra instructing his staff to say that he met with Cisneros only on a limited number of occasions and audio of Cisneros saying that he influenced Vizcarra's rise to office and decision to dissolve congress.

First Impeachment Process against Vizcarra
Then-President of Congress Manuel Merino initiated the impeachment proceedings. Eventually, the impeachment proceeding passed, but when the voting to remove him from office came, it did not gain the required 87 votes out of 130 congress, as 78 voted against.

Ninth period (November 2020)

Removal of Martín Vizcarra
Again on 20 October, impeachment proceedings were sparked. Eventually, the only party that voted against his second impeachment was the Purple Party. The vote for removal passed on 9 November 2020, citing corruption during Vizcarra's time as Governor of Moquegua, Minister of Transportation, and First Vice President of Peru (concurrently with Minister of Transportation until 2018). This sparked the beginning of the ninth Period and the end of the eighth.

Manuel Merino's ascension to the presidency
Since Vizcarra's Vice presidents were vacant, Manuel Merino, The President of Congress, took power, which marked the first time the Accion Popular (Popular Action) had the presidency since Fernando Belaunde Terry in 1985. Merino would be inaugurated on 10 November 2020, 10:42 A.M Peru Time.

Protests

Violent protests sparked throughout the country. Merino used the military and police forces to suppress the protests. Merino's rise to power was seen by many Peruvians, media outlets, several foreign governments, and allies to Vizcarra as a coup. Countries like El Salvador and Venezuela (under Maduro's government), supported the protesters, while Ecuador supported Merino's government. Cities like Lima, Trujillo, Arequipa, Iquitos, Pucalpa, Ica, and Tacna were put on curfew. Comparisons to the Chilean Protests were drawn.

Deaths of Inti Sotelo and Brian Pintado
On 14 November 2020, the Deaths of Inti Sotelo and Brian Pintado (es) occurred during the protests, which in response, led to the resignation of almost the entire Merino Cabinet.

Resignation of Merino
On 15 November, the rest of Merino's cabinet, prime minister Antero Flores Araoz, and Merino himself resigned due to backlash but labor protests continued as Francisco Sagasti assumed the presidency. Sagasti formed a provisional government, and put Merino under investigation. Sagasti was supported by the United States, Chile, Costa Rica, and others.

Tenth period (2021–present)

Vacunagate

In early 2021, a scandal broke out when the irregular vaccinations of 487 people, including high-ranking officials including Hernando de Soto Polar, Vizcarra, Maribel Díaz Cabello, and Elizabeth Astete were made public. Astete, who was then the Minister of Foreign Relations, resigned on 14 February 2021 after these irregular vaccinations were made public.

2021 electoral crisis

Elections were held on 11 April 2021. Main candidates included Verónika Mendoza, Keiko Fujimori, Hernando de Soto Polar, Yonhy Lescano, Pedro Castillo, Julio Guzman, and Daniel Salaverry. On election day, Pedro Castillo and his party Free Peru seized the opinion poll's percentage and was the most voted candidate in the first round. Originally, Fujimori, George Forsyth, Lescano, De Soto Polar, and Guzman were favorites. Almost everyone was caught offguard, and celebrations in Cajamarca, Castillo's hometown, went into the morning of 12 April. For the entirety of 12 April, Castillo's opponent was disputed between De Soto Polar, Fujimori, and Lescano, until it was clear that Fujimori had come second place. The second round would be a battle between Fujimorist free-market, rightwing populism represented by Fujimori's Popular Force, and an agrarian, socialist populism represented by Castillo's Free Peru. Many centrists and rightists condemned Castillo's so-called 'polling coup', including Martin Vizcarra, Antauro Humala, Manuel Merino, Alberto Fujimori, and Mauricio Mulder. Members of the Shining Path, communists, leftists, and member of the Free Peru party celebrated Castillo's victory in the first round. However, Free Peru also seized the congressional voting polls, and ended up with 20% of the vote.

During the election, Castillo was shown to have won, but Fujimori refused to accept the results and claimed that fraud had been committed. The National Jury of Elections eventually declared Castillo as President-elect on 19 July after Fujimori and Castillo both called for protesters, fearing clashes between Fujimorists, and Socialists. Castillo was sworn in on 28 July 2021.

Atttempts to remove Pedro Castillo
In late 2021, several attempts were made to remove Castillo from office. In October 2021, the website El Foco released recordings revealing that leaders of the manufacturing employers' organization National Society of Industries (SNI) [es], the leader of the Union of Multimodal Transport Guilds of Peru (UGTRANM), Geovani Rafael Diez Villegas, political leaders and other business executives planned various actions, including funding transportation strikes in November 2021, in order to destabilize the Castillo government and prompt his removal.

Far-right groups of former soldiers have also allied with the political parties Popular Force, Avanza País and Popular Renewal in an effort to remove Castillo, with some veteran leaders seen directly with Rafael López Aliaga and Keiko Fujimori, who recently signed the Madrid Charter promoted by the Spanish political party Vox. These groups directed threats towards Castillo government officials and journalists while also calling for a coup d'état and insurgency. OjoPúblico compared the veteran groups to the Oath Keepers and Proud Boys of the United States, noting a possible threat of an event similar to the 2021 United States Capitol attack occurring in Peru.

The Congress attempted to open an impeachment proceeding, which failed in December 2021. A second attempt in March 2022 did result in an impeachment proceeding, but ultimately failed. Following the second failed impeachment, a transportation union leader who previously cooperated with politicians and businessmen to destabilize Castillo's government helped organize a general strike that expanded into the 2022 Peruvian protests.

2022 protests against Castillo

Mass protests against Castillo's government began on 28 March 2022. State of emergency was declared throughout the country on 7 April.

Self-coup attempt by Castillo 

On 7 December 2022, Castillo attempted to dissolve the Congress of Peru in the face of imminent impeachment proceedings by the legislative body, immediately enacting a curfew, establishing an emergency government and calling for a constituent assembly. The act was recognized by politicians, the Constitutional Court of Peru and media as a coup d'état, with some comparing it to the autogolpe of Alberto Fujimori during the 1992 Peruvian self-coup d'état. Members of Castillo's government resigned from their positions shortly after his announcement to dissolve congress, with the Peruvian Armed Forces also rejecting the president's actions.

Castillo was impeached on the same day, and ceased to be president after the Constitutional Court of Peru rejected his dissolution of Congress. Castillo's vice president, Dina Boluarte, was sworn in as the new president later that day. Castillo himself was arrested soon after.

Pro-Castillo protests

Following Castillo's removal, his supporters started nationwide protests demanding his release and Boluarte's resignation. On 14 December, the government declared a 30-day state of emergency.

Supporters of Castillo were angered at the actions against the former president, demanding immediate general elections and staging nationwide protests. Protests erupted in violence on 11 December near the southern city of Andahuaylas where demonstrators closed the airport, with police in a helicopter reportedly firing upon protesters, killing two individuals. President Boluarte attempted to appease protests by proposing elections two years early, for April 2024, though Castillo supporters rejected the call while Castillo described such actions as a "dirty game". Congress would reject Boluarte's proposal for early elections. However, Congress reconsidered the proposal on 21 December 2022 and allowed the discussion of early elections to begin in 2023. Police brutality against protesters led to the Juliaca massacre on 9 January 2023.

Impact on foreign relations
Since Peru departed from a leftist government in 2016, it marked the end of socialist control of the country. This resulted in the worsening of relations with Ecuador, who had tried to build a border wall, which led to Peru recalling its ambassador from Ecuador. If Castillo were to be elected president, relations with neighboring countries such as Chile, Colombia, Brazil, and Ecuador would worsen, while relations with the Maduro's Venezuela, Bolivia, and Cuba would improve. However, during the five-day mandate of Merino, El Salvador called on not recognising Merino, calling it a coup government. However, Argentina, Chile, Brazil, Ecuador, and Colombia, went along and supported Merino. Sagasti was supported by Costa Rica, the United States, Chile, and El Salvador. Venezuela supported the protesters. However, various Human Rights groups advised Governments not to recognize Merino.

After Castillo's ouster, a new shakeup occurred in regards to Peru's foreign relations after Mexico said that it would continue to recognize Castillo as Peru's president.

See also
 1992 Peruvian constitutional crisis
 2009 Peruvian political crisis
 2020s in political history

References

2017 in Peru
2018 in Peru
2019 in Peru
2020 in Peru
2021 in Peru
2022 in Peru
2023 in Peru
2017 in politics
2018 in politics
2019 in politics
2020 in politics
2021 in politics
2022 in politics
2023 in politics
Peru
Political controversies
Political history of Peru
Protests in Peru